The Jaffray Baronetcy, of Skilts in the Parish of Studley in the County of Warwick, is a title in the Baronetage of the United Kingdom. It was created on 8 October 1892 for the journalist and newspaper proprietor John Jaffray. He was the co-founder of the Birmingham Post and Birmingham Mail.

The second Baronet was High Sheriff of Warwickshire in 1906. The fourth Baronet, Sir William Edmund Jaffray, was a Colonel in the Warwickshire Yeomanry and a deputy lieutenant of Warwickshire.

The fifth and present baronet succeeded to the title as an infant on his father's death. He was educated at Eton and in 1981 married Cynthia Ross Corrington, a daughter of John Corrington III, of Montreal. They have three sons and a daughter and are divorced. The heir to the baronetcy is Nicholas Gordon Alexander Jaffray, born 1982.

Jaffray baronets, of Skilts (1892)
Sir John Jaffray, 1st Baronet (1818–1901)
Sir William Jaffray, 2nd Baronet (1852–1914), married Alice Mary Galloway
Sir John Henry Jaffray, 3rd Baronet (1893–1916), son of the second Baronet 
Colonel Sir William Edmund Jaffray, 4th Baronet (29 July 1895 – 24 October 1953), younger son of the second Baronet
Sir William Otho Jaffray, 5th Baronet (born 1 November 1951), son of the fourth baronet

Notes

References
Kidd, Charles, Williamson, David (editors). Debrett's Peerage and Baronetage (1990 edition). New York: St Martin's Press, 1990, 

Baronetcies in the Baronetage of the United Kingdom